Salooni is the tehsil headquarter and Sub-Division in Chamba district of Himachal Pradesh, India. Salooni is an important regional administrative and economic centre. It has a mini secretariat, SDM office, government senior secondary school, Degree College, community health centre and many other sub-division level important government offices. Salooni falls under Dalhousie legislative constituency. The entrance to the small township has a series of few quaint shops, followed by small ground with an ancient goddess Kali temple at other end.

History
Salooni according to one version is believed to be a corrupt form of "Sailani" (tourist) who frequented the place since the time of the rajas. Other versions says because of its beauty, the place was called "Saloni" which in English meant attractive and charming. Saloni, therefore, is the origin of Salooni.

Geography
Chamba is wholly mountainous with few plain valleys in between two mountain ranges and alongside rivers. It has views of the Greater Himalaya snow ranges.

Salooni Village, Chamba is surrounded by places of interest to the enterprising tourist and special look out points, commanding panoramic views abound on all sides. The river Ravi rises in the snow-peaks of Bara Banghal in Chamba, and the river Beas from a glacial lake near Rohtang. The last snow range is Dhaula Dhar running parallel to the Pir Panjal, south of it. Both these ranges enclose the attraction of Salooni, at a height of 1829 meters and 56 Km from Chamba, offers a breath – taking panoramic view of the snow covered hills and peaks Of Pir-panjal and Dhaula Dhar. Situated at the top of a ridge and opening into the Bhandal valley, this scenic spot leads also to Bhadarwah (J&k). Salooni is known for its view of the Pir Panjal Range, one can behold a crystal clear view of this range which is usually snow-capped all around the year. It has a population of about 2000 and lies at a height of 1829 to 3200 meters.

Physical features
Salooni is a vantage point for some of the finest views in this kaleidoscopic topography. It stares into the Bhandal valley. This place links Chamba with Kashmir valley. The Salooni is also known for its Apple Orchards, vegetables and toughest roads.

 Bhandal Valley  (trek to Kishtwar J&k)
The Bhandal Valley with its wealth of wildlife is at the western extremity of Himachal Pradesh. Approachable from Chamba, it is the base for a trek route that connects Chamba to the Kishtwar region of Jammu and Kashmir over the Dagni Dhar. The route begins along the right bank of the River Ravi, goes past Pukhri, down to the Siyul stream, then rises to Salooni on the Prithvi Jor ridge to finally arrive above the valley.

 Salooni has also been featured in Bollywood movies including Badhaai Ho Badhaai, Vinashak – Destroyer and Dor.

Tourist sites
Salooni forms the part of Dalhousei valley and is shares its border with Bhaderwah valley of Jammu and Kashmir and the Salooni Valley.
Garh mata Mandir is one of the popular Religious Organization located in At Border jammu and kashmir and H.P.
 The Gamgul Siahbehi Wildlife Sanctuary lies 20 km from Salooni with Musk deer, Barking deer, Snow Leopards, Himalayas tahr, Pheasants, Rabbits and large species of fauna and colourful birds. The place is revered to be home of the rare ‘Kashmir Stag’. It is a one of a kind place to be and attracts many photographers and wildlife enthusiasts. Western Tragopan can be found at Gamgul Sanctuary and nearby places.
 Baira Siul is a hydropower project on the riverbank in Surgani. It is the first project of the NHPC in India and produces 180 megawatts of electricity.
 Taleru boating point is the only boating spot in the locality. Boating is done on the lake formed by Chamera Dam. The lake was formed naturally while the dam construction happened and is a lovely place for a picnic and quite frequented by the locals too. In the Movie ‘Dor’ this lake was pictured during the song ‘Yeh hausala kaise juhke’.
It also is surrounded by panoramic views.
Temple of Mata anjani is in the middle of a lake which is surrounded by green lush meadows.

Rest house
There are number of rest houses in locality, run by HPPWD, IPH Department and Forest Department. The HPPWD rest house in Salooni is constructed way back in 1908. It is surrounded by deodar trees. Salooni has quite a few other rest houses owned by IPH Department and various other government departments. Other nearby rest houses are in Kihar, Sundala, Dhargala, Bhandal, Himgiri and Diur.

Climate
In summers temperatures seldom crosses . Weather throughout the year is pleasant.

Transport
Salooni is well connected to Chamba by road. It also has a helipad.

References

External links
https://www.facebook.com/SalooniTehsil/

Cities and towns in Chamba district